Phachara Khongwatmai (born 3 May 1999) is a Thai professional golfer.

Khongwatmai became the youngest winner of a professional tournament when he won the Singha Hua Hin Open on the All Thailand Golf Tour in July 2013 at the age of 14.

Khongwatmai played on the Asian Tour and Asian Development Tour in 2015. On the Asian Tour, he finished 64th on the Order of Merit, missing a 2016 Asian Tour card by one spot. On the Asian Development Tour, he won the PGM CCM Rahman Putra Championship in March at the age of 15, becoming the youngest winner on that tour. He also won the final tournament of the year, the Boonchu Ruangkit Championship to finish fifth on the ADT Order of Merit and earn his 2016 Asian Tour card. He also qualified for the 2016 Open Championship by finishing sixth at the 2015 Thailand Golf Championship.

Amateur wins
2012 TGA-CAT Junior Championship

Professional wins (10)

Asian Tour wins (1)

Asian Tour playoff record (0–1)

Asian Development Tour wins (2)

1Co-sanctioned by the Professional Golf of Malaysia Tour
2Co-sanctioned by the All Thailand Golf Tour

All Thailand Golf Tour wins (7)

1Co-sanctioned by the ASEAN PGA Tour
2Co-sanctioned by the Asian Development Tour

Other wins (1)

Results in major championships

CUT = missed the half-way cut
"T" = tied

Results in World Golf Championships

"T" = Tied

Team appearances
Professional
EurAsia Cup (representing Asia): 2018

References

External links

Phachara Khongwatmai
Asian Tour golfers
LIV Golf players
Phachara Khongwatmai
1999 births
Living people